The Juan Cristobal Armijo Homestead, at 207 Griegos Rd., NE in Albuquerque, New Mexico, was built in 1875. It was listed on the New Mexico State Register of Cultural Properties in 1978 and the National Register of Historic Places in 1982.

It has also been known as Outlook Ranch and as Hacienda del Lago.  It is a Territorial hacienda, built of terrones (sod bricks) with multiple rooms surrounding a placita.

The house is set back in the property and screened by trees and shrubberies.  The property includes a man-made pond created around 1950, which gives the property its "Hacienda del Lago" name. It is adjacent to another historic property, the Juan de Dios Chavez House.

References

National Register of Historic Places in Albuquerque, New Mexico
Buildings and structures completed in 1875
Houses in Albuquerque, New Mexico
New Mexico State Register of Cultural Properties